The Economic Recovery Plan 2021 is a €3.5 billion stimulus package announced by the Government of Ireland on 1 June 2021 to achieve rapid job creation and economic growth after the COVID-19 pandemic. The plan sets out a new phase of supports, investment and policies for a new stage of economic recovery and renewal, with new measures for businesses and affected sectors, and details for existing emergency pandemic financial supports including the COVID-19 Restrictions Support Scheme, Employment Wage Subsidy Scheme and Pandemic Unemployment Payment, giving certainty to businesses and employees and for those who need it most.

Four pillars of the plan
The Economic Recovery Plan is broken down into four pillars:

 – Reaching 2.5 million people in work by 2024.

Extension of supports
 Employment Wage Subsidy Scheme (EWSS) and Pandemic Unemployment Payment (PUP) extended for the rest of 2021 with phased adjustments

Practical supports such as individual advice, CV preparation and work placements
 Expanded Jobs Plus Scheme to 8,000 places
 Workplace Experience Programme, 10,000 participants by 2022

Upskilling and reskilling
 Accelerated availability of 50,000 extra education and training places
 Investment of €114m in education and training through Solas Recovery Skills Programme
 10,000 additional apprenticeships per annum by 2025

 – Helping business to recover and embrace new opportunities.

Extension and enhancement
 Extension and enhancement of the COVID-19 Restrictions Support Scheme (CRSS)
 Extension of the Commercial Rates Waiver and Debt Warehousing Schemes
 New Business Resumption Support Scheme
 SME and Entrepreneurship Growth Plan – 2,000 additional SMEs to begin exporting by end 2025
 IDA 2021-2024 Strategy – aims to win 800 total investments to support creation of 50,000 jobs

Support and planning for sectors that have been particularly impacted by the pandemic
 Lower Tourism VAT rate of 9% extended to 1 September 2022
 Live Performance Support Scheme (LPSS)
 Music and Entertainment Business Assistance Scheme
 New events sector support scheme
 Fáilte Ireland initiatives including Business Continuity Scheme
 Roadmap for Aviation Recovery

Building resilient, productive and innovative businesses for the future
 Digital Transformation of Enterprise Fund
 National Artificial Intelligence Strategy
 Technological University Fund
 National Grand Challenges Programme

 – Building on the lessons of the pandemic.

Supporting a digital and green economy
 €915 million of funding under the European Recovery and Resilience Facility
 Retrofit Loan Scheme

Balanced regional development
 Updated National Development Plan
 Brexit Adjustment Reserve (over €1 billion)
 Remote Working Strategy

Fair recovery
 Social dialogue
 Statutory sick pay
 Wellbeing Framework
 Just Transition

Key elements of the plan
 A substantial extension of the Employment Wage Subsidy Scheme (EWSS), the Pandemic Unemployment Payment (PUP), and the COVID-19 Restrictions Support Scheme (CRSS), and considerable enhancement of both EWSS and CRSS
 The Employment Wage Subsidy Scheme will be extended beyond 30 June until 31 December 2021
 The Pandemic Unemployment Payment will be extended in full for existing claimants beyond 30 June to 7 September. The scheme will close to new applicants from 1 July in recognition that, at that stage, there should be no new job lay-offs that are directly attributable to public health restrictions
 The current weekly rates of support will be gradually reduced over three phases by €50 increments. The first phase of rate changes will apply from 7 September provided progress on reopening continues. Two further phases of changes will take place over the following months, on 16 November and 8 February, if progress continues as expected
 PUP claims for students will be extended until the start of the 2021/2022 college year (final payment on 7 September). In addition, €10 million in assistance will provide supports for the forthcoming academic year for students impacted by COVID-19
 Complemented by a range of initiatives including extension of Commercial Rates Waiver, new additional Business Resumption Support Scheme, and extension of Tax Debt Warehousing Scheme
 Continuing to provide supports for worst-affected sectors including aviation, tourism and events as they continue to reopen, including the extension of 9% VAT rate for tourism and hospitality sector, supports for live entertainment and events sector, and a roadmap for the aviation sector
 A roadmap for the recovery path for the aviation sector is rooted in the reopening of international travel, supports for workers and sectoral specific supports
 Non-essential travel can return from 19 July and for travel within the European Union area, Ireland will be operating the EU Digital COVID-19 Certificate
 As part of Government's support for the tourism sector, the lower tourism and hospitality VAT rate of 9% will be extended to 1 September 2022, and Fáilte Ireland will continue its support initiatives including through its Business Continuity Scheme or equivalent schemes
 Strategic investment that will drive the digital and green transition, as well as supporting social and economic recovery and job creation
 Overarching ambition to exceed pre-crisis employment levels by reaching 2.5 million people in work by 2024
 Help people back into work, and into new sustainable job opportunities through increased activation, and reskilling and upskilling opportunities
 A pathway to a strong, resilient economy, aligned with the Government's green and digital ambitions
 Learn lessons from the pandemic by building a balanced and inclusive recovery, which leverages new ways of working, and by improving labour market supports and living standards
 Ensuring sustainable public finances for a lasting recovery

See also
 July Jobs Stimulus

References

External links
 Gov.ie – Economic Recovery Plan

2021 in economics
Economic impact of the COVID-19 pandemic in the Republic of Ireland
Economy of the Republic of Ireland
Economy of Europe
Economic responses to the COVID-19 pandemic
Economic stimulus programs